Rafael Nadal was the defending champion, but was forced to withdraw due to a knee injury.

Unseeded Juan Martín del Potro won in the final 6–4, 7–5, against second-seeded Richard Gasquet.

Seeds
The top four seeds receive a bye into the second round.

Draw

Finals

Top half

Bottom half

External links
 Draw
 Qualifying draw

Stuttgart Open Singles
Singles 2008